The Tall Headlines is a 1952 British drama film directed by Terence Young and starring André Morell, Flora Robson, Michael Denison, Peter Burton, Sid James and Dennis Price. It was shot at Walton Studios outside London. In the United States the film was retitled The Frightened Bride. It was based on the 1950 novel of the same title by Audrey Erskine Lindop.

Premise
A middle-class family suffer agonies when their eldest son is hanged for murder.

Cast

Critical reception
Allmovie called it a "grim British drama," but approved of "An excellent all-character-actor cast includes Flora Robson and Andre Morrell as the grieving parents, Michael Denison as the brother and Mai Zetterling as the initial murder victim."; whereas TV Guide wrote, "Decent performances by some well-known British actors and actresses are wasted on this unbelievable story."

References

External links

1952 films
1952 drama films
British drama films
1950s English-language films
Films directed by Terence Young
British black-and-white films
Films shot at Nettlefold Studios
1950s British films